is a Japanese festival that takes place on the island of Sugashima in Toba, Mie Prefecture, Japan in early July each year.

Description
The origins of the festival are said to lie in an episode some seven hundred years ago, when a white snake came ashore on Sugashima, where it was worshipped as a messenger of Ryūjin, guardian deity of the island alongside . The festival, once held on the eleventh day of the sixth month of the old lunisolar calendar, now takes place on the eleventh of July each year, or on the Saturday closest to this date. Early in the morning, in the waters to the northeast of the island off , which is usually closed to fishing, Sugashima's fishing boats, decked out with large fishing flags, gather in worship of Shirohige Myōjin. At around 8 a.m., after purification by a Shinto priest and a beach dance, and upon the sounding of a conch, the ama diving-girls, clad in white , all enter the water and compete to catch a pair of black and red abalone. The first to return with paired abalone, one male one female, places them on a board from a boat and dedicates them to Shirohige Myōjin at Shirohige Jinja, the kami's tutelary shrine.  These offerings are termed  and are said to invite other abalone and promise a good catch, while the ama in question becomes the head ama for the year. The beach, shrine, and surrounding waters where the festival takes place are all situated and protected within Ise-Shima National Park.

See also

 Festivals in Mie Prefecture
 Toba Sea-Folk Museum
 Ise Jingū, Meoto Iwa
 Toba Castle
 Haenyeo
 Maneki-neko

References

External links
 Shirongo Matsuri
Festivals in Mie Prefecture
Toba, Mie